Alelu (also Romanized as Ālelū; also known as Ālīlū) is a village in Quri Chay-ye Gharbi Rural District, Saraju District, Maragheh County, East Azerbaijan Province, Iran. At the 2006 census, its population was 30, in 5 families.

References 

Towns and villages in Maragheh County